Artúr Harmat (27 June 1885 in Bojná – 26 April 1962 in Budapest) was a Hungarian composer. He was a student of Ferenc Kersch.

Works, editions and recordings
 De Profundis on Musica Sacra Hungarica Budapest Monteverdi Choir, Eva Kollar

References

Hungarian composers
Hungarian male composers
1885 births
1962 deaths
People from Topoľčany District
20th-century Hungarian male musicians